Dollie can refer to:

People
Dollie Radford (1858–1920), English poet and writer
Dollie McLean, founder of Artists Collective, Inc.

Other uses
Dollie Clothes an online fashion brand
Dollie, West Virginia
Dollie de Luxe, a Norwegian pop music duo
The Dollies, a 5-member dance group for the Stanford Band
Dollie & Me a brand of children's clothing
The Adventures of Dollie, a 1908 film by D.W Griffith
Princess Dollie Aur Uska Magic Bag, an Indian television series

See also
Dolley, a given name
Dolly (disambiguation)
Doily